54th Infantry Division may refer to:
 54th Infantry Division "Napoli"
 54th Infantry Division (German Empire)
 54th Infantry Division (India)
 54th Infantry Division (Russian Empire)